Amity High School is a regional public high school located in Woodbridge, Connecticut, United States. It provides high school education (grades 9-12) for the children in the towns of Woodbridge, Orange, and Bethany (which together form Regional District #5 for the purpose of secondary education). The name Amity is derived from both the colonial history of Woodbridge as well as the "friendship" demonstrated among the three founding towns in arranging for a communal educational program.

In 2014, Newsweek magazine ranked Amity 112th among public high schools nationally, higher than any other high school in the state.

During the 2014-2015 academic year, the school district spent $17,091 per pupil, as compared to the state average of $16,249. Approximately 51% were residents of Orange, 29% were residents of Woodbridge and 20% were residents of Bethany. About 87.3% of the students were white, 7.9% were Asian-American, 2.6% were Hispanic, 2.0% were African-American and 0.2% were American Indian. There were approximately 122 teachers and 1,636 students, for an average student-teacher ratio of 13.4:1, although the actual ratio varies by course and teacher contract.

Grade arrangement 
Until 2005, only sophomores through seniors attended Amity High School, while freshmen attended either the junior high school in Orange (for residents of Orange) or the junior high school in Bethany (for residents of Bethany and Woodbridge). Seventh and eighth graders also attended the junior high schools. In 2005, the ninth graders began to attend Amity High School and the junior high schools were renamed Amity Middle School.

Scandals 
The high school building was rebuilt in the early 1990s, although the auditorium and gymnasium were not replaced. Subsequent to the construction, some staff and students experienced problems caused by mold and poor ventilation. The auditorium was closed in 2003 and then demolished and replaced in 2007.

In March 2002, an investigation reported that a budget deficit of $2.8 million was caused by financial mismanagement. The residents of the three towns demonstrated their unhappiness by rejecting seventeen proposed budgets during the 2002-3 fiscal year.

In April 2010, Sue Cantin, a former secretary in the school district office, pleaded no contest to misdemeanor charges of embezzling $107,512 in student activity funds. She was expected to repay the whole sum by April 2012.

Athletics 
The school sports teams are known as "The Spartans" and "Lady Spartans" and compete in the Housatonic Division of the Southern Connecticut Conference.

In 1978, the football team won the CIAC Class LL championship.

The Amity girls' volleyball team competes in the CIAC's highest division. The team won the CIAC Class L tournament in 1981, 1982, 1983, 1985, 1986, 1989, 1990, 1994, 1995, 2003 and 2018 

The Amity boys' tennis team won the CIAC Class LL state team tournament in 1987, 2004 and 2015.

The Amity softball team won the CIAC Class LL tournament in 2001, 2002, 2003, 2005, 2012 and 2018.

The baseball team won the CIAC Class LL baseball tournament in 2006 with an 18-2-0 record, in 2007 with a 20-0-0 record, in 2013 with a 16-4-0 record and in 2014 with a 12-8-0 record.

The girls' indoor track team won the CIAC Class L championship in 1998 and the CIAC Class LL championship in 2005. The girls' track & field team had undefeated 2011 and 2012 outdoor seasons.

The boys' cross country team won the CIAC Class LL championship in 2005 and 2010, and the CIAC Class L championship in 2008. The girls' cross country team won the CIAC Class L championship in 1988 and 1989.
The boys' indoor track team won the CIAC Class LL championship in 2004 and 2005 and the CIAC Class L championship in 2009.  The boys' outdoor track team won the CIAC Class LL championship in 2000 and 2010 and the Class L championship in 2009.

In 2006 the Amity girls' soccer team tied the Class LL state championship with Trumbull High School, after the game went into double overtime and ended with a score of 0-0. In the S.C.C. they beat Mercy High School 1-0 in double overtime. 2006 was also the first year they won the S.C.C. championship, Class LL state title and had an undefeated regular season. Amity girls' soccer was ranked #1 in Connecticut, #2 in New England and #9 nationally at the end of the 2006 season.

In 2008, the Amity boys' ice hockey team won the state Division II title. In 2010, the team won the state Division II title.

They ceased to exist in 2016.
The Amity Ultimate Frisbee team was founded in 2006. The team won the Connecticut state championship in 2011, 2012 and 2014.

Music department 
At the beginning of the 2007-2008 year, Amity started its first competitive marching band, known as the Amity High School Spartan Marching Band. Under the direction of Phil Dolan, Amity held its first competitive show in early October 2007. Its 2007 show contained music from the film Pirates of the Caribbean: The Curse of the Black Pearl while its 2008 show contained music from the Cirque du Soleil show La Nouba. The Amity Marching Band, while new to the competitive nature of marching band, often came close to the scores of bands who have competed for decades. In addition, they won first place at both of their season's final competitions. In the 2009-2010 season, the Amity Marching Band went on hiatus, while a new staged performance called Music In Motion was put into a trial production. Two shows were held on October 23 and 24, 2009. This new stage production contained a variety of the Amity Band concepts, including marching, jazz, drumline, colorguard and dance. The show included music from The Phantom of the Opera, the film Pirates of the Caribbean: The Curse of the Black Pearl, and the theme music from television show The Simpsons. In addition, several band members put together an imitation of the dance group Stomp, using push brooms and garbage pails to create a chorus of percussion. As of 2010 following 2009's success, Music and Motion permanently replaced the marching band. For the 2010 show, Amity put on a performance including multiple numbers from the show which inspired the program, Blast! such as "Malagueña", "Boléro", and Gee, Officer Krupke! (from West Side Story). In addition, numbers such as "Chameleon" and "Somewhere Over the Rainbow" exclusively featured other sections such as colorguard and jazz band, respectively.

Other musical groups include the concert band, wind ensemble, strings and choir. They practice individually and perform together for holiday and spring concerts as well as a POPS concert, held annually since 1969.

Theater department 
In 2007 the Amity Board of Education created a fully funded theater department with classes in acting, technical theater and dance. A new auditorium opened that year with the play The Laramie Project. In the Spring 2008 semester the theater department performed the musical Grease. Later in 2008, the department performed the play The Boys Next Door, for which it won the Moss Hart Award for Best High School Production by the New England Theater Conference. In Spring 2009, Amity was the first high school in the state to perform the controversial musical Rent: School Edition. Many parents and students in the Amity community had mixed feelings on the production as it depicts homosexuality, drug use and AIDS. On December 12, 2009, the department performed the play And Then They Came for Me. The play is about two Jewish refugee families and their connection to Anne Frank. The production received Honorable Mention in the Moss Hart Awards from the New England Theater Conference. The department performed the musical Les Misérables in Spring 2010, for which it won four awards at the 2010 Connecticut High School Musical Theater Awards. In December 2010, the theater department performed the play Bang, Bang, You're Dead, and in Spring 2011, the musical Chicago. For that production, Amity received 12 nominations at the 2011 Connecticut High School Musical Theater Awards, but only took home one. In 2013, the theater department showed Sweeney Todd: The Demon Barber of Fleet Street and took home Best Musical, Best Orchestra, Best Key Performer, and other awards to total eight awards won that year. In 2014, the theater department showed In the Heights, and only won the newly created Sound Design Award. In 2018, the theater department produced The Addams Family for which it was nominated for 8 awards at the 1st annual Stephen Sondheim Awards at the Shubert Theater in New Haven, CT, winning the award for Best Musical.

In December 2018, the theater program performed The Curious Incident of the Dog in the Night-Time, featuring an actual Black Labrador. That show and the program's April 2019 musical, Catch Me If You Can, both received positive reviews.

During the 2019-2020 school year, the program is scheduled to perform the play Dancing At Lugnasa and the musical The Drowsy Chaperone.

During the 2021-2022 school year, the program is performed the play Puffs, and the musical Mamma Mia!

Debate Team

One of the most active and competitive clubs at Amity include the Amity Debate Team. In the 2019-2020 school year, the Amity Debate Team competed in the International Public Policy Forum competition. The team advanced to the Elite Eight finals, ranking Top 8 internationally and given the chance to compete for the championship. Unfortunately, the competition was cancelled due to COVID-19 shutdowns, and the team was awarded $2,500. The Amity Debate Team is also known for competing monthly in the Connecticut Debate Association, championing multiple debates every year from 2017 to 2020 and being the school with the most amount state finals qualifiers in 2019 and 2020.

Quiz Bowls 
In 1980, a three-student team from Amity Regional High School won the championship of the inaugural Connecticut High School Bowl, an academic quiz show produced by New Haven TV station WTNH in association with Albertus Magnus College from 1980 to 1991. In 2006, Amity Regional High School revived this extracurricular activity as the academic challenge team. The latest team is best known for participating in the Connecticut version of The Challenge, a quizbowl-type game show courtesy of Cablevision's News 12 Networks. Since then, the unique group has become increasingly popular, with many students tuning in to watch their classmates compete on television. In May 2009, Amity made it to the state quarterfinals of The Challenge for the first time in school history, but lost to the eventual Connecticut champion, Greens Farms Academy of Westport.

Notable alumni 

 William Atherton, actor, notable for role of Richard Thornburg in Die Hard and Walter Peck in Ghostbusters
 Chris Antonetti, president of baseball operations for the Cleveland Guardians
 John J. DeGioia, the first lay president of Georgetown University
 Kristen Marie Griest, one of the first two female U.S. Army Rangers
 Darren M. Haynes, SportsCenter anchor at ESPN in Bristol, Connecticut
 Dorit Kemsley, The Real Housewives of Beverly Hills
 Derek Mitchell, United States Ambassador to Burma
 David L. Rabinowitz, research scientist at Yale University and co-discoverer of several centaurs (icy asteroids in orbit between Jupiter and Nepture)
 Jonathan Rothberg, founder and former chairman of 454 Life Sciences and inventor of a technique for sequencing the human genome
 Alan Schlesinger, Connecticut Republican candidate for Senate
 Erik Stocklin, actor
 Timothy Sykes, stock trader
 Mike Vespoli, founder and chief executive officer of Vespoli USA, a boat manufacturer
 Brian Yale, bassist for the band Matchbox Twenty

References

External links 
 

Educational institutions established in 1954
Schools in New Haven County, Connecticut
Public high schools in Connecticut
Woodbridge, Connecticut
1954 establishments in Connecticut